The Long Night of the Grave is a horror novel by American writer Charles L. Grant.  It was first published in 1986 by Donald M. Grant, Publisher, Inc. in an edition of 1,775 copies, of which 300 were signed and slipcased as a deluxe edition.  The book is the third volume of an internal trilogy which is part of Grant's Oxrun Station series.  The book includes an afterword by Grant summing up the trilogy.

Plot introduction
The novel concerns mummies in the Connecticut town of Oxrun Station, a suburb of New York.

References

Sources

1986 American novels
American horror novels
Novels set in Connecticut
Fiction about mummies
Donald M. Grant, Publisher books